Being Michael Madsen is a 2007 comedy film directed by Michael Mongillo and produced by Daniel A. Sherkow. The film takes a mockumentary approach in re-imagining actor Michael Madsen as a paparazzi-hounded movie star who hatches a revenge scheme against a tabloid journalist. The film co-stars Virginia Madsen, David Carradine, Harry Dean Stanton, Daryl Hannah, Lacey Chabert, and Debbie Rochon.

The film received a 5/5 Film Threat review, as well as positive press from the likes of Variety and BoxOffice. Two years after its international release, it was handpicked as part of Warsaw’s New Horizons Film Festival mockumentary retrospective along with the landmark films This is Spinal Tap and Man Bites Dog..

Inspired by classes he took with Steppenwolf co-founder John Malkovich, Madsen suggested the film’s title. The original screenplay was titled Turning the Tables. The mockumentary’s title is a reference to the 1999 film, Being John Malkovich.

References

External links

2007 films
2007 comedy films
American independent films
American satirical films
2007 independent films
Films about actors
Films about Hollywood, Los Angeles
American mockumentary films
2000s English-language films
2000s American films